Robert Tayler may refer to:

 Robert Walker Tayler (1852–1910), U.S. Representative from Ohio and judge
 Robert Walker Tayler Sr. (1812–1878), member of the Ohio Senate
 Robert Tayler (cricketer) (1836–1888), English cricketer

See also
 Robert Taylour (died 1745), Anglican priest in Ireland